Miran Shah Tehsil is a subdivision located in North Waziristan District, Khyber Pakhtunkhwa, Pakistan. The population is 100,680 according to the 2017 census.

Notable people 
 Mohsin Dawar
 Hanif Pashteen

See also 
 Miran Shah
 List of tehsils of Khyber Pakhtunkhwa

References 

Tehsils of Khyber Pakhtunkhwa
Populated places in North Waziristan